Yongsan Family Park is a park in Yongsan District, Seoul, South Korea. It was part of the US military base Yongsan Garrison, the headquarters of the US military in South Korea after the Korean war, including the base golf course. However, the land was returned to civilian use in November 1992 to establish this park.

References

External links

 Yongsan Family Park from Korea Tourism Organization

Parks in Seoul
Yongsan District